The Long Islet, part of the Hogan Group, is a  unpopulated long, narrow granite island, located in northern Bass Strait, lying north of the Furneaux Group in Tasmania and south of Wilsons Promontory in Victoria, in south-eastern Australia.

Fauna
Recorded breeding seabird and wader species include little penguin, short-tailed shearwater, Pacific gull, silver gull and sooty oystercatcher.  White's skink is present.

See also

 List of islands of Tasmania

References

Islands of North East Tasmania
Islands of Bass Strait
Hogan Group